Björn Håkan Vikström (born 17 July 1963) is a Finnish prelate who served as Bishop of Borgå between 2009 and 2019.

Biography
Vikström was born on 17 July 1963 in Turku, Finland. He was ordained a priest in 1988, after which he has served as a pastor in Hanko and in the Matteus Church of Helsinki, as well as a chaplain for 15 years in the parish of Kimito and Västanfjärd. He acquired his doctorate in theology in 2000 from Åbo Akademi University.

Bishop
The election for the new Bishop of Borgå was characterized as a competition between the Conservatives and the Liberals, where the Liberals were clearly victorious. Vikström's liberal Bible-mindedness was an old problem, and the discussion particularly concerned his acceptance of homosexual persons. Vikström's positive stance towards homosexuality raised resistance especially in the Swedish-speaking Ostrobothnia, where, according to one view, "many do not experience Vikström as a spiritual leader." Nonetheless, he won the 2009 bishop's election in the second round against Sixten Ekstrand in 250-199 votes. Vikström was ordained a bishop on 29 November 2009. He is the seventh bishop of the Diocese of Porvoo. Vikström was nominated for Archbishop of Turku in 2018, but lost to Tapio Luoma.

References 

1963 births
Living people
People from Turku
Finnish Lutheran bishops
Åbo Akademi University alumni